Alan Warriner-Little (born Warriner; 24 March 1962) is an English former professional darts player. Nicknamed The Iceman, he is a former World Grand Prix champion and a former runner-up at the World Professional Darts Championship.

Darts career

Before coming to prominence as a darts professional, Warriner-Little appeared as a contestant in a 1987 edition of the ITV gameshow Bullseye whilst working as a State Enrolled Nurse on Ward 13 Upper at Lancaster Moor Hospital. He scored 257 the following year when he was invited back to throw for charity.

He made his World Championship debut in 1989, losing a second-round match to Jocky Wilson in a sudden death leg, after missing 8 match darts, with Wilson going on to win the tournament for his second World Championship. Warriner reached the quarter-finals in 1991 and 1992, before reaching his first World Final in 1993 – but he lost 3–6 to John Lowe. This form took him to the top of the world rankings. 

He joined the top players in the game when they separated from the BDO after that 1993 final.

He has a consistent record in the PDC World Championship – reaching the quarter-finals seven times (1994, 1996, 1997, 2000, 2001, 2004 and 2006) and the semi-finals twice (1999 and 2003).

He won the 2001 World Grand Prix and also recorded the highest 3-dart average with a double start (106.45) which he did in the first round of that tournament. As well as that he was runner-up in this event in 2004. He also was runner-up in the World Matchplay in 1997 and 2000, as well as in the World Masters in 1998.

Personal life
Warriner was married to his first wife, Joanne, from 1987 to 1991, and married to his second wife, Kim, from 1991 to 2003. He married his third wife, Brenda Little, in the summer of 2005, and changed his name from Alan Warriner to Alan Warriner-Little. Warriner is also a Manchester United supporter.

World Championship results

BDO
 1989: Second Round (lost to Jocky Wilson 2–3) (sets)
 1990: First Round (lost to Mike Gregory 0–3)
 1991: Quarter Final (lost to Bob Anderson 3–4)
 1992: Quarter Final (lost to Kevin Kenny 0–4)
 1993: Final (lost to John Lowe 3–6)

PDC
 1994: Quarter Final (lost to Steve Brown 3–4)
 1995: Group Stage (finished second in Group 4 behind Dennis Smith)
 1996: Quarter Final (lost to Dennis Priestley 1–4)
 1997: Quarter Final (lost to Eric Bristow 3–5)
 1998: Group Stage (finished bottom in Group 8)
 1999: Semi Final (lost to Phil Taylor 3–5)
 2000: Quarter Final (lost to Phil Taylor 0–5)
 2001: Quarter Final (lost to John Part 1-4)
 2002: Second Round (lost to Colin Lloyd 4–6)
 2003: Semi Final (lost to Phil Taylor 1–6)
 2004: Quarter Final (lost to Phil Taylor 1–5)
 2005: Third Round (lost to Paul Williams 1–4)
 2006: Quarter Final (lost to Wayne Mardle 0–5)
 2007: First Round (lost to Alan Tabern 0–3)
 2008: Second Round (lost to Peter Manley 1–4)

Performance timeline

References

External links
Alan Warriner-Little's profile and stats on Darts Database

1962 births
Living people
Sportspeople from Lancaster, Lancashire
Sportspeople from Preston, Lancashire
English darts players
Darts commentators
Professional Darts Corporation founding players
British Darts Organisation players
World Grand Prix (darts) champions